is a bimonthly anthology of shōjo fiction, published in Japan by Shueisha since May 1976. Shueisha also publish light novels under their Cobalt imprint, many of which were originally serialized in the magazine.

Serializations
Maria-sama ga Miteru
Mirage of Blaze
The Earl and the Fairy

References

External links
 Official Cobalt website 

1976 establishments in Japan
Bi-monthly manga magazines published in Japan
Light novel magazines
Magazines established in 1976
Magazines published in Tokyo
Shueisha magazines